Razor Blade Smile is a 1998 British vampire film written and directed by Jake West. It stars Eileen Daly, Christopher Adamson, and Heidi James.

Plot 
150 years ago, Lilith Silver is mortally wounded as she attempts to avenge the dueling death of her lover by Sir Sethane Blake. Enamored by her spirit, Sir Sethane reveals himself to be a vampire and grants Lilith the gift (and curse) of eternal life as a vampire. Today, Lilith moves through the city as a contract killer hired to eliminate all members of the mysterious and evil Masonic "Illuminati" sect, the leader of which, not coincidentally, is Sir Sethane. Clad in black latex and armed with a coffin full of weaponry, the vampiric hitwoman hunts down her targets while the police close in on her trail, desperate to end the carnage.

Cast 
 Eileen Daly as Lilith Silver
 Christopher Adamson as Sethane Blake
 Jonathan Coote as Detective Inspector Price
 Kevin Howarth as Platinum
 David Warbeck as The Horror Movie Man
 Heidi James as Ariauna
 Isabel Brook as Silk
 Louisa Moore as Celeste
 Jennifer Guy as Cindy Arnold
 Bradley Lavelle as The Chill Pilgrim
 Peter Godwin as Illuminati Conspirator

Release
The film premiered on 19 September 1998 at Fantastisk Film Festival Lund and was released in the UK as part of the Raindance Film Festival on 22 October 1998.  It was released on DVD on 14 September 1999.

Reception 
Rotten Tomatoes, a review aggregator, reports that 0% of six surveyed critics gave the film a positive review; the average rating was 3.91/10.  Ken Eisner of Variety called it a cheesy, over-the-top vampire film with enough style to make up for its acting and plotting.  Time Out London wrote that despite the film's faults, "there's a no-nonsense, unapologetic mood that makes the film hard to dislike."  Kevin Thomas of the Los Angeles Times called it "a silly, gory, overly self-congratulatory vampire comedy".  Christopher Varney of Film Threat rated it 2/5 stars and called it "loud, atmospheric nonsense" that "rates high on the novelty factor".  David Johnson of DVD Verdict called it forgettable and generic vampire film that has a distracting visual style. Kim Newman (Sight & Sound) described the film as "essentially the work of enthusiastic fans rather than pros" noting that "performances are extremely amateurish, which hamstrings the expositions scenes and makes for a succession of annoying walk-on victims."

Awards 
The film won most of the top awards in the first B-Movie Film Festival (1999), including Best B-Movie, Director (Jake West), Actress (Eileen Daly), Cinematography, and Special Effects.

References

External links 
 
 

1998 films
1998 horror films
British independent films
British vampire films
Films directed by Jake West
Films shot in England
1990s English-language films
1990s British films